"Feel It in the Air" is a song by American rapper Beanie Sigel from his third studio album The B. Coming (2005). It is the third single from the album. The song was produced by Heavy D and features singer Melissa Jiménez.

Composition
The song features "mournful noir" saxophone in the production and contains a sample of "Whole Lotta Something Goin' On" by Raphael Ravenscroft. Lyrically, Beanie Sigel poignantly reflects on his troubled life, rapping about his feelings and paranoia regarding it.

Critical reception
In a review of The B. Coming, Andrew Friedman of Riverfront Times wrote, "The best of the melancholy tracks is a bizarre anti-single: 'Feel It in the Air' pits Beanie against a sax and his own thug spider-sense."

Remixes
On December 2, 2022, American rapper Cordae released his own freestyle of the song.

Charts

Release history

References

2005 singles
2005 songs
Beanie Sigel songs
Songs written by Beanie Sigel
Roc-A-Fella Records singles
Songs written by Heavy D